The Catherine Wheel is an album by Scottish-American musician David Byrne, released in 1981 by Sire Records. It contains Byrne's musical score for choreographer Twyla Tharp's dance project of the same name. The Catherine Wheel premiered September 22, 1981, at the Winter Garden Theatre in New York City.

The tracks "Big Blue Plymouth", "My Big Hands", "Big Business", and "What a Day That Was" were performed live by Talking Heads in 1982 and 1983; the latter two appear in their film Stop Making Sense (1984), and "What a Day That Was" appears on the album.

Byrne has also performed several of these tracks in his solo tours, including "What a Day That Was", which appeared on his DVDs Live at Union Chapel (2004) and Live from Austin, TX (2007).

Track listing
All songs written by David Byrne, except where noted.

LP
Side one
"His Wife Refused" – 4:26
"Two Soldiers" (Music: Byrne, Brian Eno) – 4:45
"The Red House" – 3:17
"My Big Hands (Fall Through the Cracks)" – 2:45
"Big Business" (Lyrics: Byrne; Music: Byrne, John Chernoff) – 5:16

Side two
"Eggs in a Briar Patch" – 3:31
"Poison" – 2:38
"Cloud Chamber" – 2:42
"What a Day That Was" – 5:32
"Big Blue Plymouth (Eyes Wide Open)" – 4:45
"Light Bath" – 1:08

Cassette/CD
"Light Bath" – 1:09
"His Wife Refused" – 4:31
"Ade" (Music: Byrne, Eno)  – 3:22
"Walking" (Music: Byrne, Chernoff)  – 0:52
"Two Soldiers" (Music: Byrne, Eno)  – 3:31
"Under the Mountain" – 0:53
"Dinosaur" – 2:36
"The Red House" – 3:17
"Wheezing" – 3:12
"Eggs in a Briar Patch" – 3:31
"Poison" – 2:31
"Cloud Chamber" – 2:50
"Black Flag" – 2:29
"My Big Hands (Fall Through the Cracks)" – 2:46
"Combat" (Music: Byrne, Chernoff)  – 2:45
"Leg Bells" (Lyrics: Byrne; Music: Byrne, Chernoff)  – 2:40
"The Blue Flame" – 3:25
"Big Business" (Lyrics: Byrne; Music: Byrne, Chernoff)  – 5:06
"Dense Beasts" – 3:11
"Five Golden Sections" – 2:53
"What a Day That Was" – 5:30
"Big Blue Plymouth (Eyes Wide Open)" – 4:43
"Light Bath" – 1:10

Personnel

Musicians
 John Chernoff – percussion (tracks 1, 4, 7, 22), gung gong (tracks 2, 10, 20), congas (tracks 3, 5), piano (track 15), galloping guitar (track 18)
 David Byrne – triggered flutes (tracks 1, 23), vocals (tracks 2, 11, 14, 16–17, 21), bass guitar (tracks 2, 4–5, 8–9, 11, 13–15, 17–20), guitars (track 2–5, 7–11, 13–15, 19–21), OBX (track 5), Primetime (track 5), deep synthesizer (track 6), clarinet (track 7), piano (tracks 7, 16, 19), Prophet (track 7–9, 14–15), horses (track 10), mini synthesizer (track 11), Prophet strings (track 11), kitchen metals (track 12), triggered calliope (tracks 13, 20), vibes (tracks 13, 20), percussion (tracks 14, 17, 19), floating guitars (track 16), fierce and high guitars (track 17), beasts (track 19), Prophet bells (track 18), second organ (track 19), synthesizer (track 21)
 Yogi Horton – drums (tracks 2, 5–6, 9–10, 14–15, 18–19, 21), concert toms (track 22)
 Bernie Worrell – Mini Moog (track 2), piano (tracks 2, 15), clavinet (track 18)
 Adrian Belew – steel drum guitar (track 2), guitars (track 5), beasts (track 6), end guitars (track 9), floating guitars (track 10) 
 Brian Eno – bass guitar (tracks 3, 5, 10), guitar (track 3), piano (track 5), vibes (track 10), Prophet scream (track 17)
 Jerry Harrison – clavinet (track 10), large drum (track 12), first organ (track 19)
 Dolette McDonald – vocals (track 11)
 Twyla Tharp – water pot (track 12)
 Richard Horowitz – nez (track 17)
 Douglas Gray – double belled euphonium (track 20)
 John Cooksey – drums (track 21)
 Steve Scales – congas (track 21)
 Sue Halloran – vocals (track 22)

Technical
 David Byrne – producer, cover photo
 Julie Last – engineer
 Cheryl Smith – assistant engineer
 Doug Bennett – engineer
 Bill Gill – assistant engineer
 Butch Jones – mixing
 Greg Calbi – mastering
 Jim Feldman – design

Charts

Release history

References

Albums produced by David Byrne
David Byrne soundtracks
1981 soundtrack albums
Theatre soundtracks
Luaka Bop soundtracks
Warner Records soundtracks
Sire Records soundtracks